Cesar Renato Baena (born January 13, 1961 in Caracas) is a retired professional footballer from Venezuela, who played as a goalkeeper during his career. Baena played professional football in Venezuela for Caracas FC. He obtained a total number of 21 caps for the Venezuela national football team.

Honours

Club
 Caracas FC
 Venezuelan Primera División (4):
 1991-1992, 1993–1994, 1996–1997, 2000–2001
 Copa Venezuela (4):
 1988, 1994, 1995, 2001
 Venezuelan Segunda División (1):
 1984

References

1961 births
Living people
Footballers from Caracas
Venezuelan footballers
Venezuelan football managers
Venezuela international footballers
Association football goalkeepers
1987 Copa América players
1989 Copa América players
1997 Copa América players
Caracas FC players
Caracas FC managers
Trujillanos FC managers
Orlando City SC non-playing staff